Walnut Grove, also known as the Robert Preston House, is a historic plantation house located just outside Bristol in Washington County, Virginia. It was built about 1815, and is a two-story, Georgian style timber-frame dwelling covered with wood weatherboard.  The house has a gable roof and has a one-story full-width porch. The Grove was built on the Walnut Grove property in 1857.

It was listed on the National Register of Historic Places in 2004.

References

Plantation houses in Virginia
Houses on the National Register of Historic Places in Virginia
Georgian architecture in Virginia
Houses completed in 1815
Houses in Washington County, Virginia
National Register of Historic Places in Washington County, Virginia
1815 establishments in Virginia